Cyclin D1 is a protein that in humans is encoded by the CCND1 gene.

Gene expression 

The CCND1 gene encodes the cyclin D1 protein.  The human CCND1 gene is located on the long arm of chromosome 11 (band 11q13).  It is 13,388 base pairs long, and translates into 295 amino acids. Cyclin D1 is expressed in all adult human tissues with the exception of cells derived from bone marrow stem cell lines (both lymphoid and myeloid).

Protein structure 

Cyclin D1 is composed of the following protein domains and motifs:
 retinoblastoma protein (pRb) binding motif;
 cyclin box domain for cyclin-dependent kinase (CDK) binding and CDK inhibitor binding;
 LxxLL binding motif for co-activator recruitment;
 PEST sequence that may mark the protein for degradation;
 threonine residue (threonine 286) that controls nuclear export and protein stability.

Function 

The protein encoded by this gene belongs to the highly conserved cyclin family, whose members are characterized by a dramatic periodicity in protein abundance throughout the cell cycle. Cyclins function as regulators of CDKs (Cyclin-dependent kinase). Different cyclins exhibit distinct expression and degradation patterns which contribute to the temporal coordination of each mitotic event. This cyclin forms a complex with and functions as a regulatory subunit of CDK4 or CDK6, whose activity is required for cell cycle G1/S transition. This protein has been shown to interact with tumor suppressor protein Rb and the expression of this gene is regulated positively by Rb. Mutations, amplification and overexpression of this gene, which alters cell cycle progression, are observed frequently in a variety of tumors and may contribute to tumorigenesis.

Immunohistochemical staining of cyclin D1 antibodies is used to diagnose mantle cell lymphoma.

Cyclin D1 has been found to be overexpressed in breast carcinoma. Its potential use as a biomarker was suggested.

Normal function 

Cyclin D1 was originally cloned as a breakpoint rearrangement in parathyroid adenoma and was shown to be required for progression through the G1 phase of the cell cycle to induce cell migration, angiogenesis and to induce the Warburg effect. Cyclin D1 is a protein required for progression through the G1 phase of the cell cycle.  During the G1 phase, it is synthesized rapidly and accumulates in the nucleus, and is degraded as the cell enters the S phase.  Cyclin D1 is a regulatory subunit of cyclin-dependent kinases CDK4 and CDK6. The protein dimerizes with CDK4/6 to regulate the G1/S phase transition and entry into the S-phase.

CDK dependent functions 

The cyclin D1-CDK4 complex promotes passage through the G1 phase by inhibiting the retinoblastoma protein (pRb).  Cyclin D1-CDK4 inhibits pRb through phosphorylation, allowing E2F transcription factors to transcribe genes required for entry into the S phase.  Inactive pRb allows cell cycle progression through the G1/S transition and allows for DNA synthesis.  Cyclin D1-CDK4 also enables the activation of cyclin E-CDK2 complex by sequestering Cip/Kip family CDK inhibitory proteins p21 and p27, allowing entry into the S phase.

Cyclin D1-CDK4 also associates with several transcription factors and transcriptional co-regulators.

CDK independent functions 

Independent of CDK, cyclin D1 binds to nuclear receptors (including estrogen receptor α, thyroid hormone receptor, PPARγ and AR ) to regulate cell proliferation, growth, and differentiation. Cyclin D1 also binds to histone acetylases and histone deacetylases to regulate cell proliferation and cell differentiation genes  in the early to mid-G1 phase.

Synthesis and degradation 

Increasing cyclin D1 levels during the G1 phase is induced by mitogenic growth factors  primarily through Ras-mediated pathways, and hormones. These Ras-mediated pathways lead to the increase in transcription of cyclin D1, and inhibit its proteolysis and export from the nucleus.  Cyclin D1 is degraded by the proteasome upon phosphorylation of threonine 286 and subsequent ubiquitylation via the CRL4-AMBRA1 E3  ubiquitin ligase complex.

Clinical significance

Deregulation in cancer 

Cyclin D1 overexpression has been shown to correlate with early cancer onset and tumor progression  and it can lead to oncogenesis by increasing anchorage-independent growth and angiogenesis via VEGF production.   Cyclin D1 overexpression can also down-regulate Fas expression, leading to increased chemotherapeutic resistance and protection from apoptosis.

An abundance of cyclin D1 can be caused by various types of deregulation, including:
 amplification of the CCND1 gene / overexpression of cyclin D1;
 chromosomal translocation of the CCND1 gene;
mutations in the degradation motif recognized by the CRL4-AMBRA1 E3 ubiquitin ligase;
 disruption of nuclear export and proteolysis of cyclin D1;
induction of transcription by oncogenic Ras, Src, ErbB2 and STATs;

Cyclin D1 overexpression is correlated with shorter cancer patient survival and increased metastasis. Amplification of the CCND1 gene is present in:
 non-small cell lung cancers (30-46%)
 head and neck squamous cell carcinomas (30-50%)
 pancreatic carcinomas (25%) 
 bladder cancer (15%)
 pituitary adenomas (49-54%) 
 breast carcinoma (13%)

Cyclin D1 overexpression is strongly correlated to ER+ breast cancer and deregulation of cyclin D1 is associated with hormone therapy resistance in breast cancer. Overexpression of Cyclin D1b, an isoform, is also present in breast and prostate cancers.

Chromosomal translocation around the cyclin D1 gene locus is often seen in B mantle cell lymphoma. In mantle cell lymphoma, cyclin D1 is translocated to the IgH promoter leading to cyclin D1 overexpression.  Chromosomal translocation of the cyclin D1 gene locus is also observed in 15 – 20% of multiple myelomas.

Therapeutic target in cancer 

Cyclin D1 and the mechanisms it regulates have the potential to be a therapeutic target for cancer drugs:

Interactions 

Cyclin D1 has been shown to interact with:

 NR3C4,
 BRCA1,
 CCNDBP1, 
 CDK4, 
 CDK6,
 ESR1
 HDAC3,
 HDACs
 NEUROD1, 
 NCOA1,
 NRF1,
 p300,
 PACSIN2,
 PCNA,
 PPARG,
 RAD51,
 RB1, 
 TAF1,  and
 NR1A2.

See also 
 Parathyroid adenoma
 Mantle Cell Lymphoma

References

Further reading